Dinychella is a genus of mites in the family Halolaelapidae. There is one described species in Dinychella, D. asperata.

References

Mesostigmata
Articles created by Qbugbot